Back to the Mansion is the fifteenth studio album by the Canadian rock band April Wine, released in 2001 (see 2001 in music).

Track listing 
All tracks written by Myles Goodwyn unless otherwise noted.

 "Won't Go There" – 3:29
 "Talk to Me" – 3:44
 "Paradise" – 4:53
 "Holiday" (B. Greenway) – 4:10
 "I'll Give You That" – 4:28
 "Wish I Could Sing" – 4:00
 "Looking for a Place (We've Never Been)" (M. Goodwyn, Barry Stock) – 3:33
 "Falling Down" (M. Goodwyn, Barry Stock) – 3:29
 "In Your World" (B. Greenway) – 4:20
 "Won't Walk That Road No More" – 3:49
 "I Am a Rock" (Paul Simon) – 3:58

Personnel 
 Myles Goodwyn – lead & background vocals, guitar, keyboards
 Brian Greenway – vocals, guitars
 Jim Clench – bass, background vocals
 Jerry Mercer – drums, background vocals

Additional guitar by: Barry Stock.

References 

April Wine albums
2001 albums
MCA Records albums
Albums produced by Myles Goodwyn